Emil Zsigmondy (11 August 1861 – 6 August 1885) was an Austrian physician and mountaineer.

Life 
Zsigmondy's parents were Hungarians: Adolf Zsigmondy, born in Pozsony, and Irma von Szakmáry, born in Martonvásár. Zsigmondy was an excellent alpinist, known for the risky nature of many of his climbs. He began mountaineering as a teenager, climbing the Reisseck in Austria in a round trip of 26 hours with his brother, Otto Zsigmondy. By the late 1870s the two brothers were climbing without guides in the Zillertal Alps. In 1881, they climbed the Ortler from the Hochjoch.

Emil Zsigmondy was the friend and companion of Ludwig Purtscheller, the great pioneer of guideless Alpine climbing. Emil and Otto climbed with Purtscheller in 1882 and 1884, including an ascent without guides of the Marinelli Couloir on Monte Rosa and the first guideless traverse of the Matterhorn. A few days later he died on the same mountain. He was killed in an attempt to climb the south face of the Meije on 6 August 1885, probably as a result of his rope slipping off a rock. The face was only conquered in 1912 by the South Tyrolese climbers Angelo Dibona and Luigi Rizzi with the brothers Guido and Max Mayer. Emil Zsigmondy's grave is a few miles away from the accident site in the small cemetery of Saint-Christophe-en-Oisans in the Dauphiné Alps. He had graduated as a doctor of medicine in 1884, less than a year before his death.

American historian and mountaineer W. A. B. Coolidge would later write: 

Zsigmondy is commemorated by the Zsigmondyspitze in the Zillertal Alps, the Brèche Zsigmondy on the Meije (part of the route followed on the successful July 1885 climb), and the Zsigmondyhütte (Rifugio Zsigmondy Comici) in the Sexten Dolomites.

Family 

Emil Zsigmondy was the second of the four sons of Dr. Adolf Zsigmondy of Pressburg, a dentist of Hungarian origin, and Irma von Szakmáry, a poet from Martonvásár. His older brother, Otto, a dentist by profession, was also known as a mountaineer. His younger brother, Richard Adolf Zsigmondy, was a chemist and in 1925 received the Nobel Prize in Chemistry. The youngest of the four brothers, Karl Zsigmondy, was a mathematician; in number theory, Zsigmondy's theorem is named after him. He was a cousin of the architect Frigyes Schulek, whose mother was Auguszta Zsigmondy.

Ascents 
 1879 - Ascent of Feldkopf (Zillertal) with Otto Zsigmondy, 25 July
 1884 - First traverse of the Marmolada, of the Punta Rocca to the Punta Penia with Otto Zsigmondy and Ludwig Purtscheller
 1884 - First ascent sans guide of Monte Civetta with Otto Zsigmondy, 5 August
 1884 - First route of the southwest face of the Croda di Trafoi (Ortler) with Otto Zsigmondy, G. Geyer and J. Prohaska, 23 August
 1884 - First ascent of the south face of the Bietschhorn with Otto Zsigmondy, Ludwig Purtscheller and Karl Schulz, 2 September
 1885 - Ascent of Bec de l'Homme (Massif des Écrins) with Otto Zsigmondy, Ludwig Purtscheller and Karl Schulz
 1885 - First ascent by the east arête of the Meije with Otto Zsigmondy and Ludwig Purtscheller, 26 and 27 July
 1885 - Attempted ascent of the south face of the Meije with Otto Zsigmondy and Karl Schulz, 6 August

Publications 

  (later editions continued by Wilhelm Paulcke and Helmut Dumler)
  (posthumous)

References

External links 

 
 
  Photos of the Zsigmondyhütte in the Sexten Dolomites

1861 births
1885 deaths
19th-century Austrian physicians
Austrian mountain climbers
Austrian people of Hungarian descent
Austrian Protestants
Mountaineering deaths
Physicians from Vienna